The University of Chemical Technology and Metallurgy is a state university in Sofia, Bulgaria, founded in 1953.

History
The university was established in 1953 as The Institute of Chemical Technology (HTI) with two faculties: Engineering-Chemical and Metallurgical. The first rector of the university was Boris Zagorchev.

Structure 
 Faculty of Chemical Technology 
 Faculty of Chemical and System Engineering 
 Faculty of Metallurgy and Materials Science

References 

Universities in Sofia